Sunni is a town , nagar panchayat and Tehsil in Shimla district in the Indian state of Himachal Pradesh. Formerly it was the capital of Bhajji princely state which was one of the several states of the Punjab States Agency.

Geography
It has an average elevation of 670 metres (2198 feet).

Demographics
 India census, Seoni had a population of 1529. Males constitute 50% of the population and females 50%. Seoni has an average literacy rate of 80%, higher than the national average of 59.5%: male literacy is 82%, and female literacy is 78%. In Seoni, 12% of the population is under 6 years of age.

References

Cities and towns in Shimla district